Nationality words link to articles with information on the nation's poetry or literature (for instance, Irish or France).

Events

Works published

850:
 Kavirajamarga, the first poetry book in the Kannada language, by King Nripatunga Amoghavarsha I

853:
 Vardhaman Charitra (Life of Vardhaman) by Asaga, the first Sanskrit biography of Jain Tirthankara, Mahavir.

Births
Death years link to the corresponding "[year] in poetry" article. There are conflicting or unreliable sources for the birth years of many people born in this period; where sources conflict, the poet is listed again and the conflict is noted:

850:
 Ki no Tomonori (died 904), Japanese waka poet

857:
 Choe Chiwon, (died unknown), in Silla (Korea)

858:
 Mansur Al-Hallaj (died 922), Persian poet, mystic, revolutionary writer and pious teacher of Sufism, most famous for his apparent, but disputed, self-proclaimed divinity

859:
 Rudaki (died 941), Persian poet

Deaths
Birth years link to the corresponding "[year] in poetry" article:

850:
 Shih-Te (born unknown), Chinese monk and poet

852:
 Du Mu (born 803), Chinese poet of the late Tang Dynasty

853:
 Ono no Takamura (born 802), Heian period scholar and poet

858:
 Li Shangyin (born 813), Chinese poet of the late Tang Dynasty

See also

 Poetry
 9th century in poetry
 9th century in literature
 List of years in poetry

Other events:
 Other events of the 12th century
 Other events of the 13th century

9th century:
 9th century in poetry
 9th century in literature

Notes

Poetry by year
Poetry